Pumilia novaceki is an extinct iguanid that lived in what is now Palm Springs, California, from the Blancan to Irvingtonian stages of the Pliocene to Early Pleistocene.

It is currently known from a partially crushed skull.  Features of the skull show both basal iguanian features, and characters very similar to the extant Iguana, suggesting that the living animal may have resembled a juvenile green iguana.

Etymology
The genus name, Pumilia, means "diminutive" in Latin, in reference to how the living animal would have resembled a very small iguana.  The specific name honors Michael J. Novacek, a colleague and friend of the describer, Mark Norell.

See also

 Lapitiguana
 Brachylophus gibbonsi

References
 Norell, Mark (December 19, 1989), "Late Cenozoic Lizards of the Anza Borrego Desert, California"  Contributions in Science, No. 414, Natural History Museum of Los Angeles County, Los Angeles, CA

Iguanidae
Pliocene reptiles of North America
Pleistocene reptiles of North America
Fossil taxa described in 1989